"Hot Rod Race" is a Western swing song about a fictional automobile race in San Pedro, California, between a Ford and a Mercury. Released in November 1950, it broke the ground for a series of hot rod songs recorded for the car culture of the 1950s and 1960s. With its hard driving boogie woogie beat, it is sometimes named one of the first rock and roll songs.

Written by George Wilson, it became a major hit for Arkie Shibley and his Mountain Dew Boys (Gilt-Edge 5021), staying on the charts for seven weeks, peaking at number five in 1951. Trying to repeat his success, Shibley recorded at least four follow-up songs.

Ramblin' Jimmie Dolan, Tiny Hill, and Red Foley, all released versions in 1951; Hill's version reached number seven on the Country chart and number 29 on the pop chart.

Shibley's record may have climbed higher and outpaced any of the others, but his second verse opened up with:

Eastern radio stations, never a fan of Western swing anyway, refused to play it.  Dolan changed the verse to say "plain folks"; Hill to "rich folks"; and Foley to "poor folks".

The song ends with:

These lyrics set the stage for an "answer song" called "Hot Rod Lincoln", first recorded in 1955.

References

External links
Article about Arkie Shibley and his difficulties in releasing the song

Western swing songs
1950 songs
1950 singles
Songs about cars
Arkie Shibley songs
Ramblin' Jimmie Dolan songs
Red Foley songs
Tiny Hill songs